Frieha Altaf is a Pakistani actress, former model, host, film director, producer and human rights activist. She is the CEO of her own Catwalk Event Management and Sahil which she founded in 1989. She also worked in classic dramas Rozi and Kohar. Frieha also worked in many films Lahore Se Aagey, Wajood, Baaji and Parey Hut Love.

Early life 
She completed her education from US and later returned to Pakistan in 1986 in Karachi there she worked as a painter and sculptor during a exhibition she was asked by a modelling agent to model for a adverstising and she agreed. Frieha's mother Yasmeen was a model in 1960s. 

Frieha also went to Canada there she studied fashion design while also teaching there at Barbizon Institute and got a diploma in fashion design.

Career 
Frieha started modelling at age 18 before going to USA and she also did theater and stage plays. Frieha's was paired with supermodel Atiya Khan for a jewellery shoot. In 1986 during the match between Pakistan versus India cricket cup in Sharjah Frieha was sent abroad for a modelling show for Maheen Khan which was a succes for Frieha. She also hosted Lux Style Ki Duniya on PTV in 1989. In 1990 she made her debut as an actress in drama Rozi as Shahana which was a successful drama.

In 1991 she worked in Haseena Moin's drama Kohar as Neelam with Shakeel, Marina Khan and Fauzia Wahab.

In 2014 she introduced actress and model Areeba Habib to Pakistani fashion industry.

In 2022 Frieha launched her own podcast called FWhy Podcast in which she interview many actors and actresses such as Humayun Saeed, Imran Ashraf and Zara Noor Abbas.

Personal life 
She married thrice but her three marriages ended in divorce. She has two children from her third marriage and took the custoday of her children and both of her children including actress Parisheh James is her daughter and singer Turhan James is her son. Frieha's sister Neshmia Ahmed is a former model and the CEO of Grandeur Art Gallery. 

In 2018 Frieha revealed in an interview with Nida Yasir and Farah that she was abused by her cook at the age of six when her parents were on vacation at Japan and that she told about it to her mother when she came back from Japan later they arrested the cook. she said that it was traumatizing for her and it affect her and her mother but later she recovered.

Filmography

Television

Web series

Film

Music video

Host

Other appearance

Ambassadorship 
 Goodwill Ambassador for Sahil in 2018

Awards and recognition

References

External links 
 
 
 
 

1964 births
20th-century Pakistani actresses
Living people
Pakistani film actresses
21st-century Pakistani actresses
Pakistani stage actresses
Pakistani producers
Pakistani television actresses
Pakistani female models
Lux Style Award winners
Pakistani film directors